The De Mas Rocks, also known as Demas Rocks is a group of rocks off the northwest coast of Trinity Peninsula, Antarctica in the approach to Huon Bay, 3 miles (4.8 km) northeast of Cape Ducorps. Discovered in March 1838 by Captain Jules Dumont d'Urville, who named the rocks after his Lieutenant François Edmond Eugene de Barlatier de Mas of the expedition ship Astrolabe. The rocks were surveyed by Falkland Islands Dependencies Survey (FIDS) in 1946.

Rock formations of the Trinity Peninsula